László Keglovich (born 4 February 1940) is a Hungarian former football player and manager. He competed at the 1968 Summer Olympics in Mexico City, where he won a gold medal with the Hungarian team.

References

External links

1940 births
Living people
People from Sopron
Hungarian people of Croatian descent
Hungarian footballers
Győri ETO FC players
Olympic footballers of Hungary
Footballers at the 1968 Summer Olympics
Hungarian football managers
Győri ETO FC managers
Olympic gold medalists for Hungary
Olympic medalists in football
Medalists at the 1968 Summer Olympics
Association football defenders
Sportspeople from Győr-Moson-Sopron County